Live is the first live album by Iron Butterfly, released on April 22, 1970. The last album to be recorded with the longstanding quartet of Brann, Bushy, Dorman, and Ingle, it is the only Iron Butterfly album which does not feature more than one lead vocalist. It was a commercial hit, reaching number 20 on the Billboard album chart.

Reception

Stephen Thomas Erlewine of AllMusic rated Live three out of five stars. He called the album "a dull document of Iron Butterfly's thundering live show," and declared the live rendition of "In-A-Gadda-Da-Vida" to be "three times as tedious" as the original version.

Track listing

Side one
 "In the Time of Our Lives" (Doug Ingle, Ron Bushy) – 4:23
 "Filled with Fear" (Ingle) – 3:27
 "Soul Experience" (Ingle, Bushy, Erik Brann, Lee Dorman) – 3:55
 "You Can't Win" (Danny Weis, Darryl DeLoach) – 2:48
 "Are You Happy" (Ingle) – 3:20

Side two
 "In-A-Gadda-Da-Vida" (Ingle) – 19:00

Charts

Personnel

Iron Butterfly
 Erik Brann – guitar
 Doug Ingle – organ, lead vocals
 Lee Dorman – bass, backing vocals
 Ron Bushy – drums

Technical
 Richard Podolor – producer
 Bill Cooper – engineer
 John Kress – album art
 Bob Jenkins, Ron Bushy – photography

References

Iron Butterfly live albums
1970 live albums
albums produced by Richard Podolor
Atco Records live albums